San Marino competed at the 2016 Summer Olympics in Rio de Janeiro, Brazil, from 5 to 21 August 2016. Since the nation's official debut in 1960, Sammarinese athletes have appeared in every edition of the Summer Olympic Games, except for a single occasion. San Marino failed to register any athletes at the 1964 Summer Olympics in Tokyo.

San Marino National Olympic Committee sent a team of four athletes, two per gender, to compete only in athletics and shooting at the Games, matching the nation's roster size with four previous editions, including London 2012. All of them made their Olympic debut in Rio de Janeiro, except for trap shooter and London 2012 fourth-place finalist Alessandra Perilli, who only returned for her second Games as the most experienced competitor. Meanwhile, Alessandra's older sister Arianna Perilli led the delegation as San Marino's flag bearer in the opening ceremony. San Marino, however, had to wait five more years for its first medal.

Athletics

San Marino has received a universality slot from IAAF to send a male athlete to the Olympics.

Field events

Shooting
 
Sammarinese shooters have achieved quota places for the following events by virtue of their best finishes at the 2014 and 2015 ISSF World Championships, the 2015 ISSF World Cup series, and European Championships or Games, as long as they obtained a minimum qualifying standard (MQS) by March 31, 2016.

Qualification Legend: Q = Qualify for the next round; q = Qualify for the bronze medal (shotgun)

References

External links 
 

Olympics
Nations at the 2016 Summer Olympics
2016